Boraginoideae is a subfamily of the plant family Boraginaceae , with about 42 genera. That family is defined in a much broader sense (Boraginaceae ) in the Angiosperm Phylogeny Group (APG) system of classification for flowering plants. The APG has not specified any subfamilial structure within Boraginaceae s.l.

Taxonomy 

Some taxonomists placed the genera Codon and Wellstedia in Boraginoideae. Others place one or both of these in separate, monogeneric subfamilies. Codon was long regarded as an odd member of Hydrophylloideae, but in 1998, a molecular phylogenetic study suggested that it is closer to Boraginoideae. Neither is included n more modern classifications.

Some authors proposed a revision of earlier APG systems, in which Boraginaceae had been included as an unplaced family (i.e. not included in a specified order) within the lamiid clade of eudicots. In that system. Boraginaceae was defined broadly (Boraginaceae sensu lato or s.l.). Instead they proposed recognizing five to eight families in a separate order, the Boraginales. In that system Boraginaceae is treated in a narrow sense (sensu stricto or s.s.). Subsequently the order Boraginales was added to the 2016 revision (APG IV) to include Boraginaceae at the ordinal level, in which it was the sole family. The consensus was to continue the broad usage rather than split it into separate families, based on its monophyletic composition. The subfamilial structure applies solely to Boraginaceae s.s., which includes around 1,600 to 1,700 species divided into some 90 genera.

Subdivision 

Comparisons of DNA sequences by cladistic methods suggested the division of Boraginoideae into four tribes: Echiochileae, Boragineae, Lithospermeae, and Cynoglosseae. This was subsequently resolved into only two tribes, Boragineae and Lithospermeae (25 genera). Boragineae was then further subdivided into two subtribes, Boragininae (15 genera) and Moritziinae (2).

Genera 

Genera and approximate number of species in the system of Chacon et al (2016):
 Tribe Boragineae
 Subtribe Boragininae (140 species)
Anchusa, Anchusella, Borago, Brunnera, Cynoglottis, Gastrocotyle, Hormuzakia, Lycopsis, Melanortocarya, Nonea, Pentaglottis, Phyllocara, Pulmonaria, Symphytum, Trachystemon
 Subtribe Moritziinae (6 species)
Moritzia, Thaumatocaryon
 Tribe Lithospermeae (460 species)
Aegonychon, Alkanna, Ancistrocarya, Arnebia, Buglossoides, Cerinthe, Cystostemon, Echiostachys, Echium, Glandora, Halacsya, Huynhia, Lithodora, Lithospermum, Lobostemon, Maharanga, Mairetis, Moltkia, Moltkiopsis, Neatostema, Onosma, Paramoltkia, Podonosma, Pontechium, Stenosolenium.

The following list of genera consists of Codon plus the genera listed for Boraginoideae at the Germplasm Resources Information Network

References

Bibliography 

 
 
 
 
 Distribution Map  Genus list  Boraginaceae  Boraginales  Trees   APweb  Missouri Botanical Garden

 
Asterid subfamilies